The 2022 American Athletic Conference football season is the 31st NCAA Division I FBS Football season of the American Athletic Conference (The American). The season is the tenth since the former Big East Conference dissolved and became the American Athletic Conference and the ninth season of the College Football Playoff in place. The American is considered a member of the Group of Five (G5) together with Conference USA, the MAC, Mountain West Conference and the Sun Belt Conference.  In September 2021, Cincinnati, Houston, and UCF accepted invitations to join the Big 12 Conference. The three schools had been contractually required to remain with The American through 2024, but the conference and its departing members reached a buyout agreement that allowed those schools to leave in 2023. The entire schedule was released on February 17, 2022.

Previous season
Cincinnati finished with a 13–1 (8–0 AAC) record, winning the AAC Championship Game against Houston. It was the second consecutive AAC championship and third consecutive AAC Championship game appearance in program history. The Bearcats were ranked fourth in the final College Football Playoff rankings, thus becoming the first Group of Five team to make the playoffs. After the Bearcats loss to Alabama in the Cotton Bowl, Cincinnati finished fourth in the final AP Poll marking the best finish in program history.

Seven AAC teams participated in bowl games during the 2021 season; the league finished 4–1.

Tulsa defeated Old Dominion 30–17 in the Myrtle Beach Bowl.  With the win, Tulsa concluded their season with an 7–6 record. With the win, Tulsa achieved their first bowl win since the 2016 Miami Beach Bowl  In the 2021 Gasparilla Bowl, UCF defeated Florida 29–17, behind standout performances by wide receiver, and game MVP, Ryan O'Keefe and running back Isiah Bowser. In the Birmingham Bowl, No. 20 Houston defeated Auburn 17–13. Cincinnati was selected to participate in the Cotton Bowl as part of the College Football Playoff against Alabama. The Bearcats lost to the Crimson Tide 27–6.

Three bowl games involving American teams were cancelled due to COVID-19: Memphis was slated to play in the Hawaii Bowl versus Hawaii. Hawaii had to withdraw from the bowl due to a shortage of available players, stemming from a combination of a COVID-19 outbreak within the team, players already out with injury, and players who transferred away from the school at the conclusion of the regular season. East Carolina was slated to play in the Military Bowl versus Boston College, the game was cancelled after Boston College said it did not have enough players to field a team because of coronavirus issues, season-ending injuries, opt-outs and transfers. SMU was originally slated to play in the Fenway Bowl versus Virginia. Virginia had to withdraw from the game due to a  number of COVID cases impacting its roster.

Preseason

Recruiting classes

American Athletic Conference media day
The 2022 American Media day was held virtually on July 28, 2022

Preseason poll
The American Athletic Conference preseason media poll was released at AAC Media Day on July 28, 2022.

First place votes in 

Award watch lists

All−American Teams

Coaches

Coaching changes
The American will enter the 2022 season with two new head football coaches:

November 30, 2021 TCU hired Sonny Dykes of SMU as its new head coach. On November 29 SMU hired Rhett Lashlee formally the Offensive Coordinator at Miami as its new coach.
November 29, 2021 Temple head coach Rod Carey was fired after having an 12–20 record in three seasons at Temple, including a 3–9 record in 2021. On December 15, Temple hired Texas associate head coach and run game coordinator Stan Drayton as its new head coach.

Coaches

Head coaching records

Note:
Records shown after the 2021 season
Years at school includes 2022 season
Source:

Mid-season changes
On November 6, South Florida fired head coach Jeff Scott after posting a record of 4–26 during his tenure at the school. South Florida named special teams coordinator Daniel Da Prato as the interim head coach. On December 4, South Florida announced that Tennessee offensive coordinator Alex Golesh would become the new head coach for the 2023 season.

Post-season changes
On November 27, Luke Fickell was announced as the new head coach of the Wisconsin Badgers of the Big Ten Conference. In the wake of the announcement, Cincinnati named special teams coach Kerry Coombs as the interim head coach for the postseason. On December 5, Cincinnati announced that Louisville head coach Scott Satterfield would become the new head coach of the team for 2023.
On November 27, Tulsa announced that it had fired head coach Philip Montgomery. Montgomery had posted a 43–53 record over eight seasons with the school. On December 6, Tulsa announced Ohio State offensive coordinator Kevin Wilson as the new head coach.
On December 11, Navy announced that it would not retain head coach Ken Niumatalolo for 2023, which would have been the last year of his contract. Niumatalolo had gone 109–83 in 15 years at the school, but ended his tenure with three consecutive losing seasons and five losses in the Midshipmen's last seven matchups against Army. Defensive coordinator Brian Newberry was named the interim head coach.

Rankings

Schedule
The 2022 American Athletic Conference football schedule was released on February 17, 2022.  The regular season begins on Thursday September 1, 2022 and will end on Saturday December 15, 2022. The American Athletic Conference Football Championship Game is scheduled to be played on Saturday December 3, 2022 at the site of the regular season champion.

All times Eastern time.

Regular season schedule

Week one

Week two

Week three

Week four

Week five

Week six

Week seven

Week eight

Week nine

Week ten

Week eleven

Week twelve

Week thirteen

Championship Game

Week fifteen

The American vs other conferences

AAC vs Power Five matchups 
The following games include AAC teams competing against Power Five conferences teams from the (ACC, Big Ten, Big 12, BYU/Notre Dame, Pac-12, and SEC). All rankings are from the AP Poll at the time of the game.

AAC vs Group of Five matchups 
The following games include AAC teams competing against "Group of Five" teams from C-USA, MAC, Mountain West and Sun Belt.

AAC vs FBS independents matchups 
The following games include AAC teams competing against FBS Independents, which includes Army, Liberty, New Mexico State, UConn and UMass.

AAC vs FCS matchups 
The following games include AAC teams competing against Football Championship Subdivision teams, which comprises 14 conferences and two independent programs.
 

Note:† Denotes Neutral Site Game

AAC Records against other conferences
2022–2023 records against non-conference foes:

Regular Season

Postseason

Postseason

Bowl games
Bowl games will begin on December 17, 2022, and will end with the College Football Playoff National Championship on January 9, 2023.

For the 2020–2025 bowl cycle, The American will annually send teams to the Military Bowl, Fenway Bowl, and a third annual spot alternating between the Armed Forces Bowl and Hawaii Bowl annually.  The American will have annually four appearances in the following bowls: Birmingham Bowl, Gasparilla Bowl, Boca Raton Bowl, Frisco Bowl, Cure Bowl, First Responder Bowl, Myrtle Beach Bowl and  New Mexico Bowl.  The American champion will go to a New Year's Six bowl if a team finishes higher than the champions of Group of Five conferences in the final College Football Playoff rankings, American teams are also eligible for the College Football Playoff if they're among the top four teams in the final CFP ranking.

 

Rankings are from CFP Poll • All times Eastern Time Zone.

Selection of teams
Bowl eligible (7): Cincinnati, East Carolina, Houston, Memphis, SMU, Tulane, UCF
Bowl-ineligible (4): Navy, South Florida, Temple, Tulsa

Awards and honors

Player of the week honors

American Athletic Individual Awards
The following individuals received postseason honors as chosen by the league's head coaches.

All-Conference Teams
The following players were selected part of the All-Conference teams.

* Denotes Unanimous Selection

All Conference Honorable Mentions:

Cincinnati: Arquon Bush (CB), Joe Huber (OT), Dylan O'Quinn (OG)
East Carolina: Isaiah Winstead (WR)
Houston: Jayce Rogers (DB)   
Memphis: Jaylon Allen (DL), Davion Ross (CB)
Navy: Jacob Busic (DL)
South Florida: Dwayne Boyles Jr. (LB), Brad Cecil (C)
SMU: Jaylon Thomas (OG)
Tulane: Larry Brooks (S), Tyrick James (TE)
Tulsa: Tyon Davis (CB)

All-Americans

The 2022 College Football All-America Team is composed of the following College Football All-American first teams chosen by the following selector organizations: Associated Press (AP), Football Writers Association of America (FWAA), American Football Coaches Association (AFCA), Walter Camp Foundation (WCFF), Sporting News (TSN, from its historic name of The Sporting News), Sports Illustrated (SI), The Athletic (Athletic), USA Today (USAT) ESPN, CBS Sports (CBS), College Football News (CFN), Athlon Sports, Phil Steele, and Fox Sports (FOX).

Currently, the NCAA compiles consensus all-America teams using a point system computed from All-America teams named by coaches associations or media sources.  Players are chosen against other players playing at their position only.  To be selected a consensus All-American, players must be chosen to the first team on at least half of the five official selectors as recognized by the NCAA.  Second- and third-team honors are used to break ties.  Players named first-team by all five selectors are deemed unanimous All-Americans. Currently, the NCAA recognizes All-Americans selected by the AP, AFCA, FWAA, TSN, and the WCFF to determine consensus and unanimous All-Americans.

List of All American Teams
 American Football Coaches Association All-America Team
 Associated Press All-America Team
 CBS Sports All-America Team
 ESPN All-America Team
 Football Writers Association of America All-America Team
 The Athletic All-America Team
 Sporting News 2022 College Football All-America Team
 USA Today All-America Team
 Walter Camp Football Foundation All-America Team

National award winners

NFL Draft
The following list includes all AAC players who were drafted in the 2023 NFL Draft.

Notes and references